The Marine 3: Homefront is a 2013 American action film starring Mike "The Miz" Mizanin and directed by Scott Wiper. The film was released on direct-to-DVD and Blu-ray in the United States on March 5, 2013. It is the third film in the film series and is a sequel to The Marine starring John Cena and The Marine 2, starring Ted DiBiase, Jr.

Plot
Jake Carter (The Miz), a member of the United States Marine Corps Force Recon and MARSOC Marine, returns home to Bridgeton, a rural town located near Seattle, Washington. As he steps off the bus, he reunites with his best friend Harkin (Jared Keeso), a police chief. When he returns home, he greets his sisters Lilly (Ashley Bell) and Amanda (Camille Sullivan), and they throw a party for his homecoming. Meanwhile, in Seattle, a regional bank is robbed by a syndicate believed to be extremists; their leader, Jonas Pope (Neal McDonough), forces the bank manager to give them what they demand. They take half the money and burn the rest in front of him. It is revealed that the syndicate dwells in a junkyard on the outskirts of town, their leader planning an explosion in the city because of revenge from his past life.

Meanwhile, Jake talks to Amanda about her running the house, but they get interrupted by Lilly, who was about to leave with her boyfriend, Darren, in a bar. Jake, who dislikes Darren, follows them and later ends up in a fight with a redneck. Lilly sees the scene and leaves with Darren; Harkin, who also witnesses the fight, calls the police and gives Jake a warning ticket. Harkin warns him that if he gets into a fight again he'll be arrested. Moments later, Amanda arrives to pick him up and admits to Jake that she is in a relationship with Harkin. The next day, Lilly and Darren stop by the same junkyard in which the syndicate dwells, and the two later witness a commotion among Jonas Pope and a smuggler. Pope becomes furious and shoots the smuggler; he then orders his henchmen to seize the witnesses when he hears Lilly yell for help. Amanda, after hearing Lilly struggling over the phone, contacts Jake about Lilly's abduction, and Jake drives off to the junkyard, where he sneaks up on a henchman who dumps off the body of the smuggler. Jake is able to hold him at gun point where the henchman reveals that the abductees were brought into an old ferry near the junkyard. When another henchman arrives, Jake physically overpowers them after they attempt to kill him. Jake then attacks another supposed henchman, who is revealed to be an FBI Agent before Special Agent Wells (Steve Bacic) comes to his aid. Jake, joined by Harkin, is brought to the FBI and informs them that the syndicate does more than kidnapping but bombing the city with RDX (Research Department Explosive), a very capable explosive.

Jake is restricted by Wells when he plans to rescue the teens by himself; instead, Wells orders the SWAT team to storm the junkyard. Meanwhile, Lilly and Darren, struggling to escape, get help from a henchman who is actually an FBI Agent in disguise (Agent Alec Simms); he leads them to a room and tells them to lock it until he returns. The SWAT team storms the base, but they are overpowered by the syndicate. Jake attempts to fight Wells, but Harkin stops him. Harkin drove and drops him off at the junkyard and allows him to fight the syndicate. Jake finishes them off one-by-one, but he gets a bone to pick with a henchman named Gabriel (Aleks Paunovic), whom he defeats. Meanwhile, the FBI agent in disguise was caught calling Wells and got killed. Lilly and Darren got separated as they are trying to escape and Lilly was held captive again. Wells receives a call from Pope telling him that he should send an unarmed cop in a sedan to escort them to downtown; if it does not arrive in 20 minutes, Lilly will die. When the sedan arrives, Eckert (Michael Eklund), Pope's associate, kills the driver cop and wears his uniform. Jake then meets up with Darren inside the ferry; Darren, feeling guilty of Lilly's captivity, leads Jake to the spot where the sedan is. Jake attempts to rescue them, but he is stopped by Galen Jackson (Ben Cotton), Pope's brother in arms; the sedan then speeds away. Pope contacts Wells that he and Eckert should be left alone or he will kill Lilly. At the parking area, Jackson searches for Jake but is killed by Darren. After studying the map left by Pope, Jake, determined to save the city, grabs a dirt bike and speeds away with Darren on his tail.

When Pope and Eckert reach the city, they were suddenly ambushed by the FBI. Pope activated the bomb inside the sedan instead. Eckert gets killed by an FBI agent while Pope takes Lilly hostage, but he was cornered by Harkin followed by Jake who successfully kills Pope. Lilly then tells them that the sedan is a bomb so Jake drives the RDX into an abandoned site near the river and manages to escape the untimely explosion. Harkin, Lilly, and Amanda rescue him, and the two sisters hug him. Lilly is amazed when Darren arrives, and they celebrate.

Cast
 Mike "The Miz" Mizanin as Sergeant Jake Carter
 Neal McDonough as Jonas Pope who earned a Doctor of Philosophy from Seattle Pacific University and is an unusual extremist who hates bankers, insurers and fat cats.
 Michael Eklund as Eckert, Jonas's accomplice
 Ashley Bell as Lilly Carter, Jake's sister
 Camille Sullivan as Amanda Carter, Jake's sister
 Jared Keeso as Harkin, local police chief and Jake's friend
 Jeff C. Ballard as Darren Carlyle, Lily's boyfriend
 Steve Bacic as Agent Wells
 Ben Cotton as Galen Jackson, leader of a small militia group out of Billings, Montana
 Darren Shahlavi as Cazel, Jonas's accomplice
 Aleks Paunovic as Gabriel
 Nicola Anderson as Agent Thompson
 Sean Tyson as Murray/Agent Alec Simms

Production
The Marine 3: Homefront is the sequel to The Marine starring John Cena and The Marine 2 starring Ted DiBiase, Jr. On February 25, 2012, WWE Studios announced a three film distribution deal with 20th Century Fox Home Entertainment and The Marine 3: Homefront was the first of that deal. 20th Century Fox handled the global distribution of the film on DVD, Video On Demand, and Online outlets. WWE Studios also used WWE's television and internet status to promote and market the film.

The film originally cast Bob Holly as the leading role but due to a neck injury, the role was passed to Randy Orton. Orton later tweeted to confirm it. A former Marine, Orton had already been cast in the lead role of The Marine 2 (2009), but after injuring his collarbone, he was replaced by Ted DiBiase. On April 3, 2012, it was reported that Randy Orton dropped out of the role because of his bad conduct discharge from the Marines in the late 1990s. Orton twice was absent without leave and disobeyed an order from a commanding officer. Orton's old Marine unit displayed public outrage of Randy being cast in the film due to his history. Orton later starred in the WWE Studios film The Condemned 2: Desert Prey.

On April 30, 2012, it was announced that Mike Mizanin would replace Orton as the lead in the film.  On June 11, 2012, it was announced that Ashley Bell and Neal McDonough have joined the cast. Scott Wiper was in talks to direct the film and to write the script. Filming began in the June 2012 and was shot in Vancouver and Maple Ridge, British Columbia.

Release
The Marine 3: Homefront was released on DVD and Blu-ray on March 5, 2013, where it grossed $3,384,892 on U.S. sales.  It placed at #12 on the top DVD sales, and #15 on top Blu-ray sales.

Reception
The Marine 3: Homefront gained mixed reviews from critics, a review from Pro Wrestling Torch.com stating, "although Marine 3 is not a good movie and Miz is miscast in the lead role, he did show some chops as an actor here and could definitely play a supporting role in future releases and not seem out of place. Unfortunately much like his current role in WWE, Miz is out of his element in Marine 3."

Another review from The Action Elite.com states: "The Miz is actually a very good and entertaining action star. I am surprised and impressed with his performance. The action is more grounded in reality than the original. The fights are brutal and fun to watch. If you need a nice change of pace, you will definitely enjoy The Marine 3. It is a very fast paced piece of action cinema that will get you pumped."

Sequel
Filming for The Marine 4: Moving Target began in April 2014. The Miz was recast to reprise his role as Carter and was joined by WWE Diva Summer Rae as the first female wrestler to appear in a WWE Studios film.

References

External links
 

2013 films
2013 action films
American action films
2010s English-language films
Films about kidnapping
Films set in British Columbia
Films set in Washington (state)
Films shot in Vancouver
Direct-to-video sequel films
Films about the United States Marine Corps
WWE Studios films
20th Century Fox direct-to-video films
2010s American films